Ludwig Ernst Emil Hoffmann (30 July 1852 – 11 November 1932) was a German architect and was one of the most famous architects of Berlin.

Life and career 

Ludwig Hoffmann was born in Darmstadt and educated at the Kunstakademie Kassel (Kassel Academy of Art) and the Bauakademie (Academy of Architecture) in Berlin. In 1879, after passing the first state examination, Hoffmann began working for the government of Berlin as a construction foreman under Franz Heinrich Schwechten. His architectural career began in 1880 when he and Peter Dybwad, both unknowns, won the competition to design the Supreme Court building in Leipzig against 118 other entries. In 1895, the year it was completed, he returned to Berlin and that June married Marie Weisbach, a banker's daughter.

In 1896, Hoffmann became Stadtbaurat—director of urban planning and construction—for Berlin. He served for 28 years until 1924 (mandatory retirement age being 72) and is now regarded as the most important holder of the position.

Under his leadership 111 facilities were built, including over 300 buildings. He designed the new administration building for the city of Berlin, now known as the Altes Stadthaus (1902—1911). He designed the Märkisches Museum (1899—1904), the museum of Berlin and the Mark Brandenburg. With Alfred Messel, he designed the built version of the Pergamon Museum on Museum Island (1910—1930). In addition he designed bridges, fountains, public baths, schools of every kind, orphanages, hospital complexes, cemeteries, private villas, and apartment buildings. In his memoirs, he describes the long history of work on the Märchenbrunnen (fountain of fairy tales) for the Volkspark Friedrichshain, the first public park in Berlin. Hoffmann had a significant impact on the urban development of Berlin both through his own designs and as a judge for many architectural competitions, although some of his projects were not constructed due to the outbreak of World War I, many were destroyed in World War II, and others were later demolished. An archive of many of his designs is kept at the Architecture Museum of the Berlin Institute of Technology.

Honors and criticism 
In 1906 Ludwig Hoffmann was awarded the title of Privy Councillor and an honorary doctorate from the Technische Universität Darmstadt. In the same year he was elected to membership of the Prussian Academy of Arts. In 1917 he received a second honorary doctorate, from the Vienna University of Technology. Upon his retirement in 1924 he was awarded honorary citizenship of Berlin. A primary school in Friedrichshain (which he built), a hospital in Pankow, a bridge in Moabit, and a street in the Sellerhausen section of Leipzig bear his name.

Hoffmann's work was long out of favor for its historicism, but is now recognized as an important part of the effort to accommodate Berlin's rapid growth prior to World War I. As early as 1956, Ludwig Mies van der Rohe admitted he had been wronged.

References

Bibliography 
 
 
 
 
 

 (CAPTCHA)

Further reading

External links 
 
 Sketches, plans, and drawings of works by Ludwig Hoffmann, Architecture Museum, Technical University of Berlin 
 Biography of Ludwig Hoffmann, Bundesverwaltungsgericht 
 Ludwig Hoffmann biography, selected works, Projekt Baerwaldbad 

1852 births
1932 deaths
19th-century German architects
Architects from Berlin
20th-century German architects
Recipients of the Pour le Mérite (civil class)